The Pleasant Grove Tithing Office at 7 South 300 East in Pleasant Grove, Utah was built c.1908.  It was listed on the National Register of Historic Places in 1985.

It is a one-story building built of brick and is one of 28 surviving historic tithing offices in Utah.  It is rare among tithing offices for its flat roof and Neoclassical style with Tuscan columns, a centered pavilion, and pilasters.

References

Tithing buildings of the Church of Jesus Christ of Latter-day Saints
Neoclassical architecture in Utah
Religious buildings and structures completed in 1908
Buildings and structures in Pleasant Grove, Utah
Former Latter Day Saint church buildings
Former churches in Utah
Properties of religious function on the National Register of Historic Places in Utah
National Register of Historic Places in Utah County, Utah
1908 establishments in Utah
Individually listed contributing properties to historic districts on the National Register in Utah